Egon Zehnder is a global management consulting and executive search firm. Egon Zehnder is the world's largest privately held executive search firm and the third largest executive search and talent strategy firm globallywith an annual revenue of CHF 804 million. The firm offers services in Executive Search, Board Consulting and Leadership Strategy Services.

History
The firm was founded in 1964 by Egon P.S. Zehnder (1930–2021) (a 1956 Harvard Business School graduate) and would later grow to having 68 offices in 40 countries.

In 1992, The Wall Street Journal reported that Dr. Zehnder, who at the time was 62, had transitioned out of running the firm and that A. Daniel Meiland, who had been the firm's regional director for North America, would be named chairman of the executive committee and chief executive officer of the company.

In 2000, The Wall Street Journal reported that Egon Zehnder International (as the company was called at the time) was the largest executive search firm in Europe.

From 2008 to 2014, Damien O’Brien was the chief executive officer. O'Brien then served as Chairman from 2010 to 2018. Jill Ader was his successor, and was elected as Chairperson June 2018. Michael Ensser took over as Chair on Nov. 1, 2022. Edilson Camara serves as CEO.

Corporate structure
In 2022, Egon Zehnder had 560 consultants across 63 offices and 36 countries.

Events & Initiatives

Leaders & Daughters 
Egon Zehnder introduced Leaders & Daughters in March 2015 in London to provide a forum for addressing both the gender divide and the opportunity gap faced by the next generation of women leaders. The event brings together leaders and their daughters and mentees to discuss the obstacles women leaders face and how to tackle such obstacles.

The event, which marks its 6th year in 2020, is held across 32 cities worldwide and over 5,000 attendees annually.

Letters to My Daughter 
As part of the Leaders & Daughters initiative, Egon Zehnder invites leaders to write letters to their daughters to collectively inspire, cultivate and pave a better future for the next generation of female leaders.

Exclusive Research 
Egon Zehnder has conducted exclusive research on diversity, inclusion and leadership.

Leaders and Daughters Survey 2017 
The Leaders & Daughters 2017 survey explores findings from over 7,000 professional female respondents worldwide in Australia, Brazil, China, Germany, India, the United States and the United Kingdom on topics ranging from career motivations and ambition to professional advancement and key influencers.

The CEO: A Personal Reflection 
Egon Zehnder's The CEO: A Personal Reflection surveyed 402 CEOs from various industries, countries and corporate structures. They shared perspectives on the realities of the role, their preparation, their succession planning process, and how they lead and cope in these volatile times.

Global Board Diversity Analysis: 2012-2022 
Egon Zehnder has tracked gender and international diversity on boards around the world for the past 18 years.

2012 European Board Diversity Analysis 
The 2012 European Board Diversity Analysis looked at the boards of 353 of the largest companies across 17 European countries between May and June 2012. The analysis aims to contrast and compare the progress made by European companies in diversifying their boards. Data was gathered to measure how many women are engaged as board members in Europe, what is the nature of their engagement – executive roles vs. non-executive roles, leadership roles on the board or within committees – and whether women’s participation on boards has increased or decreased over time. The research also looked briefly at wider definitions of diversity such as non-national board memberships.

2014 European Board Diversity Analysis with a Global Perspective 
The 2014 European Board Diversity Analysis – the sixth in a series of biennial studies initiated in 2004 – profiles the boards of 356 of the largest companies across 17 European countries. The 2014 study also includes a global perspective, exploring gender diversity across 568 large company boards in other regions of the world.

2016 Global Board Diversity Analysis (GBDA) 
The Egon Zehnder 2016 Global Board Diversity Analysis (GBDA) evaluates board data from 1,491 public companies with market capitalization exceeding EUR 6bn across 44 countries.

2018 Global Board Diversity Tracker: Who’s Really On Board? 
Their 2018 report,  Who's Really on Board?, analyzes BoardEx data from 1,610 public companies with market caps above 7 billion euros in 44 different countries as of May 2018. In countries with fewer large companies, they use the six largest companies as measured by market capitalization.

2020 Global Board Diversity Tracker: Who’s Really On Board? 
The 2020 report analyzes data from 1,685 public companies with market caps above 6 billion euros in 44 different countries.

2022 Global Board Diversity Tracker: Who's Really on Board? 
Their 2022 report analyzed a total of 19,958 board seats – using data from 1,776 publicly-traded companies across 44 countries with a combined market capitalization of €8bn.

References

External links

The Focus online (corporate magazine)
Leaders & Daughters (An Egon Zehnder Initiative) Official website

Companies based in Zürich
Consulting firms established in 1964
Executive search firms
International management consulting firms
Privately held companies of Switzerland
Companies listed on the SIX Swiss Exchange
1964 establishments in Switzerland